The 187th Ohio Infantry Regiment, sometimes 187th Ohio Volunteer Infantry (or 187th OVI) was an infantry regiment in the Union Army during the American Civil War.

Service
The 187th Ohio Infantry was organized at Camp Chase in Columbus, Ohio, and mustered in for one year service on March 2, 1865, under the command of Colonel Andrew R. Z. Dawson.

The regiment was left Ohio for Nashville, Tennessee, March 3, 1865. Served provost duty at Nashville, Dalton, and Macon, Georgia, until January 1866. Attached to 1st Brigade, 2nd Separate Division, District of the Etowah, and Department of Georgia.

The 187th Ohio Infantry mustered out of service January 20, 1866.

Casualties
The regiment lost a total of 54 men during service; 1 enlisted man killed and 1 officer and 52 enlisted men due to disease.

Commanders
 Colonel Andrew R. Z. Dawson

See also

 List of Ohio Civil War units
 Ohio in the Civil War

References
 Dyer, Frederick H. A Compendium of the War of the Rebellion (Des Moines, IA:  Dyer Pub. Co.), 1908.
 Ohio Roster Commission. Official Roster of the Soldiers of the State of Ohio in the War on the Rebellion, 1861–1865, Compiled Under the Direction of the Roster Commission (Akron, OH: Werner Co.), 1886–1895.
 Reid, Whitelaw. Ohio in the War: Her Statesmen, Her Generals, and Soldiers (Cincinnati, OH: Moore, Wilstach, & Baldwin), 1868. 
Attribution

External links
 Ohio in the Civil War: 187th Ohio Volunteer Infantry by Larry Stevens

Military units and formations established in 1865
Military units and formations disestablished in 1866
1865 disestablishments in Ohio
Military units and formations disestablished in 1865
Units and formations of the Union Army from Ohio
1865 establishments in Ohio
1866 disestablishments in Ohio